Mario G. Montejo is a Filipino engineer and government administrator. He served as Secretary of Science and Technology under President Benigno Aquino III. Prior to his appointment as secretary, he was a professor at the College of Engineering of the University of the Philippines Diliman.

Science and Technology Secretary
In describing Montejo during the announcement of his Cabinet appointments to the Science and Technology Department post, president Benigno Aquino III said Montejo's team was responsible for the featured slides and waves at the water amusement park Water Fun using Filipino technology."

References

 

Living people
Secretaries of Science and Technology (Philippines)
Benigno Aquino III administration cabinet members
Filipino engineers
Academic staff of the University of the Philippines
Year of birth missing (living people)